Medieval fashion may refer to:

 Early medieval European dress
 English medieval clothing

See also 
 Anglo-Saxon dress
 History of Western fashion